James Leo O'Neill (February 23, 1893 – September 5, 1976) was a backup shortstop in Major League Baseball who played for the Washington Senators. He batted and threw right-handed.

A native of Minooka, Pennsylvania, where he played for the Minooka Blues in the Northeast Pennsylvania Temperance League, O'Neill played for a significant number of minor league clubs, beginning in 1914 and ending in 1930. He played with the Washington Senators in part of two seasons in 1920 and 1923, and posted a .287 batting average with one home run and 43 RBI in 109 games. 

O'Neill was the youngest of four brothers who played in the major leagues. Steve, the most prominent of the four, was a catcher in the majors for 17 years and also managed the Indians, Tigers, Red Sox and Phillies. Jack caught with the Cardinals, Cubs and Beaneaters, and Mike was a pitcher and left fielder for the Cardinals and Reds.

O'Neill died in Chambersburg, Pennsylvania, at the age of 83.

External links
Baseball Reference
Retrosheet

20th-century American people
1893 births
1976 deaths
American people of Irish descent
Washington Senators (1901–1960) players
Major League Baseball shortstops
Baseball players from Pennsylvania
Sportspeople from Scranton, Pennsylvania